The 2004 World Champions v Asia Stars Challenge was an invitational professional non-ranking snooker tournament which ran for one year.

This was, in effect, the same event as the Euro-Asia Masters Challenge which ran a season earlier but under a different name. This time, the field consisted of four world champions, Stephen Hendry, John Higgins, Ken Doherty and Mark Williams plus James Wattana, Ding Junhui, Marco Fu and up and coming Thai player, Atthasit Mahitthi. The format was the same with the players split into two round robin groups with the top two from each progressing to the semi finals.

Results

Round-robin stage
Group A

Results:
 Ding Junhui  3–1 John Higgins
 James Wattana 3–1 Mark Williams
 John Higgins 3–1 James Wattana
 Ding Junhui 3–2 Mark Williams
 James Wattana 3–2 Ding Junhui
 John Higgins 3–2 Mark Williams

Group B

Results:
 Atthasit Mahitthi  3–0 Marco Fu
 Atthasit Mahitthi 3–0 Stephen Hendry
 Marco Fu 3–0 Stephen Hendry
 Stephen Hendry 3–0 Ken Doherty
 Atthasit Mahitthi 3–1 Ken Doherty
 Marco Fu 3–2 Ken Doherty

Knock-out stage

References

Snooker non-ranking competitions
World Champions v Asia Stars Challenge